Pristimantis batrachites is a species of frogs in the family Strabomantidae.

It is endemic to Colombia.
Its natural habitats are tropical moist montane forests.
It is threatened by habitat loss.

References

batrachites
Endemic fauna of Colombia
Amphibians of Colombia
Frogs of South America
Amphibians described in 2003
Taxonomy articles created by Polbot